The 1989 3. divisjon, the third highest association football league for men in Norway. 

22 games were played in 5 groups and 18 games were played in 1 group, 3 points given for wins and 1 for draws. Sprint/Jeløy, Sandefjord, Kristiansund, Os	, Hødd and Skarp were promoted to the 2. divisjon. The three worst placed teams in each group were relegated to the 4. divisjon, except the best performing team finishing third to last.

League tables

Group A

Group B

Group C

Group D

Group E

Group F

References
 Third division tables 1989.

3
Norway
Norwegian Third Division seasons